Vienna is an unincorporated community in Vienna Township, Scott County, in the U.S. state of Indiana.

History 
A post office was established at Vienna in 1832, and remained in operation until it was discontinued in 1942. The community was named after Vienna, in Austria.

Geography 

Population

Demographics

References 

Unincorporated communities in Scott County, Indiana
Unincorporated communities in Indiana